Tom Tuttle (11 September 1920 – 6 January 1997) was an Australian cricketer. He played three first-class cricket matches for Victoria between 1938 and 1947.

See also
 List of Victoria first-class cricketers

References

External links
 

1920 births
1997 deaths
Australian cricketers
Victoria cricketers
Cricketers from Melbourne